Fort Reliance is an abandoned trading post in the Yukon Territory of Canada. The fort was established in 1874 by François Mercier, Jack McQuesten, and Francis Barnfield for the Alaska Commercial Company to serve as a trading post.

Trading at Fort Reliance continued uninterrupted until 1877. During this time, the post became a major landmark for traders. The Fortymile River, Sixtymile River, and Seventymile River were named for their distance from the fort. In 1877, traders abandoned the fort after natives stole their goods. Traders returned in 1879 and operated the fort until 1886, when it was abandoned due to a gold strike on the Stewart River. The gold strike diverted traders' attention from fur trapping, and thus the fort assumed less importance.

History 
Fort Reliance was originally established as a fur trading post to accommodate trade with the Native Han people. The site of the fort was chosen by François Mercier and it was constructed by Jack McQuesten and Francis Barnfield with the help of the Han natives. After the construction of the fort, McQuesten and Barnfield began trading with the natives. They were able to trade all of their goods for valuable furs. The first year proved the profitability of the fort. Fort Reliance would become a major trading hub in the region until it was abandoned by the traders in 1877 due to the theft of their goods by some of the Han natives. Jack McQuesten returned to the fort in 1879 in order to avoid the competition with other trading post down river. He was discouraged from going back to Fort Reliance by a chief of a neighboring tribe because, after the fort had been abandoned, some of the native women were killed by rat poison mixed with animal fat that was left behind by the traders. The chief feared for McQuesten's safety if he were to return to the fort. McQuesten decided to continue on to Fort Reliance and found that he was actually welcomed by the Han natives upon his return. They even compensated him for the previously stolen good and they did not blame the traders for the death of the women. The fort continued to be operated as a fur trading post, but eventually became a supply stop for gold prospectors on the Yukon. When gold was found on the Stewart River, a tributary of the Yukon river downstream from Fort Reliance, trade was diverted away from the fort and it was abandoned.

Buildings 

Fort Reliance consisted of several buildings of various types of construction. All that remains of these buildings are ground features such as pits or post holes. After it was abandoned, many of its buildings were used as fuel by the steamboats that sailed the Yukon River. The main buildings consisted of three or four log cabins built for the traders. The largest of these cabins was described by François Mercier to be roughly 25 feet (7.6 m) long by 30 feet (9.1 m) wide. The remains of five pit houses are found at the site. These pits were roughly 4.5 to 5 meters square and four of the five had dug out entryways leading into them that were between 2.5 and 5 meters long. The pit houses were likely inhabited by the Han Indians that traded at the site.

Native Han occupation 

The site of Fort Reliance contains signs of occupation by the Native Han Indians before the establishment of the fort and during its operation as a trade post. The remains of a Han fishing village, Nuclaco, exist on a small island near the west bank of the Yukon river, just across from the fort. The site was occupied seasonally during the king and chum salmon runs in the summer.

Demographics

Fort Reliance was erroneously reported on the 1880 United States Census as being located within Alaska (Yukon Division), despite being some 50 miles due east of the international boundary. It featured 83 residents, of which 1 was White and 82 were of the Tinneh tribe.

References 

Forts in Yukon
1874 establishments in Canada